This is a list of Brazilian television related events from 1956.

Events

Debuts

Television shows

Births
1 July - Solange Couto, actress & TV host

Deaths

See also
1956 in Brazil